Passive may refer to:
 Passive voice, a grammatical voice common in many languages, see also  Pseudopassive
 Passive language, a language from which an interpreter works
 Passivity (behavior), the condition of submitting to the influence of one's superior
 Passive-aggressive behavior, resistance to following through with expectations in interpersonal or occupational situations
 Passive income, income resulting from cash flow received on a regular basis
 Passive immunity, the transfer of active humoral immunity
 Passive experience, observation lacking recipricol interaction; and wrought with delusion of control.

Science and technology
 Passivation (chemistry), process of making a material "passive" in relation to another material prior to using the materials together
 Passivity (engineering) a property of engineering systems, particularly in analog electronics and control systems
 Passive solar building design, which uses (or avoids) sunlight as an energy source without active mechanical systems
 Passive house, a standard for energy efficiency in buildings
 Passive mode, in regard to how a data connection is established in File Transfer Protocol

Entertainment
 "Passive" (song), by A Perfect Circle

See also
 Active (disambiguation)
 Vicarious (disambiguation)
 Surrogate (disambiguation)